Yazd Province (Ostān-e Yazd) is one of the 31 provinces of Iran. It is in the center of the country, and its capital is the city of Yazd. In 2014, it was placed in Region 5. The province has an area of 76,469 km2.

At the time of the National Census of 2006, the population of the province was 958,323 in 258,691 households. The following census of 2011 counted 1,074,428 people living in 309,749 households. At the most recent census of 2016, Yazd province had undergone an increase in population to 1,138,533 in 340,657 households, by which time Tabas County had been separated from the province and joined South Khorasan province.

Geography 

Mountains of Yazd 
South- and Southwestern Mountains
This group is wider than the other ridges and includes Shir Kuh

Eastern Mountains
They are located in the east of Yazd province with the highest peaks being Bon Lokht (3002)

Administrative divisions

Cities 

According to the 2016 census, 971,355 people (over 85% of the population of Yazd province) live in the following cities: Abarkuh 27,524, Ahmadabad 6,046, Aqda 1,754, Ardakan 75,271, Ashkezar 19,123, Bafq 45,453, Bafruiyeh 6,939 Behabad 9,232, Hamidiya 51,793, Herat 13,032, Khezrabad 535, Marvast 9,379, Mehrdasht 8,097, Mehriz 34,237, Meybod 80,712, Nadushan 2,351, Nir 1,740, Shahediyeh 18,309, Taft 18,464, Yazd 529,673, and Zarach 11,691.

Gallery

References

 

Provinces of Iran